The 2006 FIU Golden Panthers football team represented Florida International University in the 2006 NCAA Division I FBS football season. They participated as members of the Sun Belt Conference. The Golden Panthers played their home games at the on-campus FIU Stadium in Miami, Florida. The team was coached by Don Strock in his fifth and final season as head coach, before he resigned at the end of the year. The season was marred by the infamous brawl against the University of Miami in the seventh week of the season, which would precipitate Strock's resignation.

The Golden Panthers finished the 2006 season winless in twelve games and were outscored by their opponents by a combined total of 313 to 115. Their average of 9.6 points scored per game was the worst in the FBS that year.

Schedule

NFL draftees
The following FIU players were selected in the 2007 NFL Draft:

References

FIU
FIU Panthers football seasons
FIU Golden Panthers football